The 2005 MTV Video Music Brazil was hosted by Selton Mello and took place at the Credicard Hall. It was the only edition of the awards where the presenters of the main categories performed a song or a medley of songs related to the category presented before introducing the nominees and announcing the winners. In 2005, the Viewer's Choice and Video of the Year categories were combined into a single category; before 2005, the Video of the Year award was chosen by a jury of experts, while most of the categories were decided by the viewers.

Nominations
Winners are in bold text.

Video of the Year
B5 — "Só Mais Uma Vez"
Capital Inicial — "Respirar Você"
Catedral — "A Poesia e Eu"
Charlie Brown Jr. — "Champanhe e Água Benta"
Cidade Negra — "Perto de Deus"
CPM 22 — "Um Minuto Para o Fim do Mundo"
Dead Fish — "Queda Livre"
Detonautas — "Tênis Roque"
Dogão — "Banho e Tosa"
Ira! and Pitty — "Eu Quero Sempre Mais"
Jota Quest — "Além do Horizonte"
KLB — "Carolina"
Ludov — "Kriptonita"
Marcelo D2 — "1967"
O Rappa — "Mar de Gente"
Pitty — "Semana Que Vem"
Sandy & Junior — "Nada Vai me Sufocar"
Tihuana — "Renata"
Titãs — "Vou Duvidar"
Wanessa Camargo — "Metade de Mim"

Best New Artist
Black Alien — "Babylon by Gus"
F.UR.T.O. — "Não Se Preocupe Comigo"
Leela — "Te Procuro"
Nervoso — "Já Desmanchei Minha Relação"
Trêmula — "Selvagens Procurando Lei"

Best Pop Video
Gabriel o Pensador — "Palavras Repetidas"
Ludov — "Kriptonita"
Nando Reis e os Infernais — "O Mundo é Bão Sebastião"
Pato Fu — "Anormal"
Sandy & Junior — "Nada Vai me Sufocar"

Best Rock Video
Cachorro Grande — "Você Não Sabe o Que Perdeu"
Charlie Brown Jr. — "Champanhe e Água Benta"
CPM 22 — "Irreversível"
Ira! — "Flerte Fatal"
Pitty — "Anacrônico"

Best Rap Video
Black Alien — "Babylon by Gus"
Da Guedes — "Jornada"
Helião and Negra Li — "Exército do Rap"
Rappin' Hood — "Us Guerreiro"
Thaíde — "Caboclinho Comum"

Best MPB Video
Arnaldo Antunes — "Saiba"
Bid and Elza Soares — "Mandingueira"
Los Hermanos — "O Vento"
Marcelo D2 — "A Maldição do Samba"
Sidney Magal — "Tenho"

Best Electronic Video
Anderson Noise — "Homem Cachorro"
DJ Ramilson Maia and Pato Banton — "Macuna"
Freakplasma — "The Ride"
Marcelinho da Lua — "Refazenda"
Sonic Jr. — "Pulsar"

Best Independent Video
Astronautas — "Cidade Cinza"
Autoramas — "Você Sabe"
Jumbo Elektro — "Freak Cat"
Rock Rocket — "Puro Amor em Alto Amor"
Wander Wildner — "Hippie-Punk-Rajnesh"

Best Live Performance
Detonautas — "Tênis Roque"
Ira! and Pitty — "Eu Quero Sempre Mais"
Kid Abelha — "Poligamia"
Nando Reis e os Infernais — "Do Seu Lado"
Ultramen and Falcão — "Dívida"

Best Direction in a Video
Autoramas — "Você Sabe" (Director: Luis Carone)
Charlie Brown Jr. — "Champanhe e Água Benta" (Director: Roberto Oliveira and Alex Miranda)
Ira! — "Flerte Fatal" (Director: Selton Mello)
Nando Reis and Os Infernais — "O Mundo é Bão Sebastião" (Director: Doca Corbert, Binho Jr., Titi Freak and Whip)
Pato Fu — "Anormal" (Director: Jarbas Agnelli)

Best Art Direction in a Video
Autoramas — "Você Sabe"
Ira! — "Flerte Fatal"
Nando Reis and Os Infernais — "O Mundo é Bão Sebastião"
Pato Fu — "Anormal"
Sandy & Junior — "Nada Vai me Sufocar"

Best Editing in a Video
Autoramas — "Você Sabe"
Charlie Brown Jr. — "Champanhe e Água Benta"
F.UR.T.O. — "Não Se Preocupe Comigo"
Nando Reis and Os Infernais — "O Mundo é Bão, Sebastião!"
Pato Fu — "Anormal"

Best Cinematography in a Video
Autoramas — "Você Sabe"
Bid and Elza Soares — "Mandingueira"
Ira! — "Flerte Fatal"
Gabriel o Pensador — "Palavras Repetidas"
Ludov — "Kriptonita"

Best International Video
Avril Lavigne — "He Wasn't"
Backstreet Boys — "Incomplete"
Britney Spears — "Do Somethin'"
Destiny's Child — "Lose My Breath"
Green Day — "Boulevard of Broken Dreams"
Good Charlotte — "I Just Wanna Live"
Hanson — "Penny & Me"
Linkin Park/Jay-Z — "Jigga What/Faint"
Maroon 5 — "This Love"
System of a Down — "B.Y.O.B."

Best Website
Bidê ou Balde (www.bideoubalde.com.br)
CPM 22 (www.cpm22.com.br)
Marcelo D2 (www.marcelod2.com.br)
Moptop (www.moptop.com.br)
Pato Fu (www.patofu.com.br)

Dream Band
Vocals: Pitty
Guitar: Edgard Scandurra
Bass: Champignon
Drums: Ricardo Japinha

Performances
 O Rappa — "Na Frente Do Reto"
 Cachorro Grande — "Você Não Sabe o Que Perdeu"
 Nando Reis e os Infernais — "Por Onde Andei"
 Pitty — "Anacrônico"
 Os Paralamas do Sucesso — "Na Pista"
 Dado Villa-Lobos (featuring Dinho Ouro Preto and Os Paralamas do Sucesso — "Conexão Amazônica"
 Ultraje a Rigor (featuring the lead vocalists of rock bands: Leela, Forfun, Dibob and Ramirez) — "Nós Vamos Invadir Sua Praia"
 Los Hermanos — "O Vento"
 2005 VMB Dream Band winners — "I Wanna Be Sedated"
 Titãs — "Vossa Excelência"

Mtv Video Music Brazil, 2005
Mtv Video Music Brazil, 2005
MTV Video Music Brazil